Mufutau Adesanya Kasali  MFR is the present Oba Moyegeso of Itele in Ijebu-East, Ogun State, Nigeria.

Early life and education
Mufutau Adesanya Kasali was born on 13 December 1943. He attended Ijebu Ode Grammar School in Ijebu Ode from 1961 to 1966 for his secondary education. He later proceeded to the University of Lagos where he earned a degree in Electrical Engineering in 1972. He is a trained engineer and also a member of Nigerian Society of Engineers.

Career

He worked as a senior engineer with the old National Electrical Power Authority (NEPA), now  Power Holding Company of Nigeria (PHCN) until his retirement.

Selection and coronation

He was unanimously selected from the Ishagbola Ruling House as the Oba Moyegeso of Itele-Elect in 2000. He was subsequently crowned and presented instruments of office by the Ogun State Government on March 3, 2003.

Awards
In 2011, Kasali was awarded MFR, a national honour by the Federal Government of Nigeria.

References

Nigerian royalty
Yoruba monarchs
People from Ogun State
1943 births
Living people